Michael Donohoe (February 22, 1864January 17, 1958) of Philadelphia was a U.S. Representative from Pennsylvania from 1911 to 1915. He was an Irish Catholic Democrat.

Biography
Michael Donohoe was born in Killeshandra, County Cavan, Ireland.  He attended a private classical school, and taught as principal of a national school from January 1885 until October 1886.  He immigrated to the United States and settled in Philadelphia, Pennsylvania, on November 8, 1886.  He worked as a real-estate broker, and engaged in banking and in the manufacture of glassware.

Donohoe was elected as a Democrat to the Sixty-second and Sixty-third Congresses.  He was an unsuccessful candidate for reelection in 1914. He was a candidate for mayor of Philadelphia, Pennsylvania in 1931.  He also served as director of Northwestern General Hospital from 1893 to 1943, and as a trustee of Temple University.  He was the real-estate assessor for the city of Philadelphia from April 15, 1919, to March 31, 1946, when he retired.  He died in Philadelphia in 1958 and was interred in Holy Sepulchre Cemetery in Cheltenham Township, Pennsylvania.

References

The Political Graveyard

1864 births
1958 deaths
Politicians from Philadelphia
Politicians from County Cavan
Irish emigrants to the United States (before 1923)
Democratic Party members of the United States House of Representatives from Pennsylvania